Halhadar Das (born 2 August 1986) is an Indian cricketer. He played as a wicket-keeper batsman for Odisha. He has also played for the East Zone in the Ranji Trophy, and the Deccan Chargers and Kolkata Knight Riders in the IPL. Now he represents the Michigan Cricket Stars in Minor League Cricket.

References

External links
 
https://www.odishabytes.com/former-odisha-captain-haladhar-das-to-represent-yankee-royals-in-us-open-t20/amp/

1986 births
Indian cricketers
Odisha cricketers
Deccan Chargers cricketers
Kolkata Knight Riders cricketers
East Zone cricketers
People from Dhenkanal
Living people
Cricketers from Odisha
Wicket-keepers